Tchissakid Dre Player (born February 4, 1992) is a Canadian football offensive lineman who is a free agent. He was drafted by the BC Lions in the second round of the 2014 CFL Draft. He played  college football at Northwestern State University and attended Cedar Hill High School in Cedar Hill, Texas. Player has also been a member of the Winnipeg Blue Bombers and Saskatchewan Roughriders of the Canadian Football League (CFL).

Professional career

BC Lions
Player was drafted by the BC Lions with the twelfth pick in the 2014 CFL Draft. He scored a receiving touchdown against the Edmonton Eskimos on June 28, 2014 He was released by the Lions on June 18, 2016.

Winnipeg Blue Bombers
Player was signed to the Winnipeg Blue Bombers' practice roster on July 4, 2016. He was released by the team on July 17, 2016.

Saskatchewan Rough Riders
Player was signed to the Saskatchewan Roughriders' practice roster in July 2016. He was released by the team on August 9, 2016.

References

External links
Northwestern State Demons bio
BC Lions profile

1992 births
Living people
BC Lions players
Canadian football offensive linemen
Northwestern State Demons football players
Ojibwe people
Players of Canadian football from Manitoba
Saskatchewan Roughriders players
Canadian football people from Winnipeg
Winnipeg Blue Bombers players